Provideniya Bay Airport  (also Urelik and Ureliki) is a small airport in Chukotka, Russia located 3 km southwest of Provideniya. It services primarily small transport aircraft. A concrete apron contains four parking spaces.

Military history
In 1954, an 8,200 ft (2,500 m) hard surface runway capable of supporting a fighter regiment and jet bomber deployments was constructed. This attracted the interest of the US intelligence community as Provideniya was the closest Soviet military airfield to the United States.  By 1964, at least three S-75 Dvina (SA-2) surface-to-air missile sites were identified surrounding the airfield.

A division of MiG-17 Fresco and MiG-19 aircraft was based at the airport between 1960 and 1968, along with three Mil Mi-4 helicopters. However after the Cold War, the airfield had deteriorated and was not adequate for Russia's modern military operations. There are anecdotal reports that it has received Tupolev Tu-95MR deployment flights as part of military exercises.

Civilian history
This airport was famous for the 1988 flight of Alaska Airlines known as the Friendship Flight at that time, as well as a similar Bering Air flight in May of the same year.

On 25 July 2005, a Swedish Airforce C-130 Hercules landed in Provideniya Bay, bringing in an international research team from the Beringia 2005 expedition, organized by the Swedish Polar Research Secretariat.

The airport itself and the surrounding towns are not accessible to foreigners without a special permit from the Russian government.

Airlines and destinations

Chukotavia operates infrequent service to the regional capital Anadyr, usually 3-5 times a month. It also operates scheduled helicopter services around the region using a Mi-8, such as to Enmelen, Egvekinot and Lavrentiya.

Bering Air operates chartered tourist flights several times a year using small aircraft such as Beechcraft 1900 and CASA C-212 Aviocar.

References
World Aero Data

External links
 Flying to Russia on the New VFR Route - A General Guide - Federal Aviation Administration / Alaskan Region
 FAA description of the B369 VFR route Nome-Provideniya
 Swedish C130 at Provideniya Bay Airport

Russian Air Force bases
Soviet Air Force bases
Airports built in the Soviet Union
Airports in Chukotka Autonomous Okrug
Providensky District